Sir William Portus Cullen  (28 May 1855 – 6 April 1935) was an Australian barrister, the 7th Chief Justice of New South Wales, Lieutenant-Governor of New South Wales, and Chancellor of the University of Sydney.

Early life and education
Cullen was born at Mount Johnston, near Jamberoo, New South Wales, the seventh son of John and Rebecca (née Clinton) Cullen. A brother, Joseph Cullen, was a Member of Parliament for both New South Wales and Western Australia. William was educated at country state schools, including Kiama, and the University of Sydney, where he won a scholarship.

William Cullen graduated B.A. with first class honours in classics in 1880, M.A. in 1882, LL.B. in 1885 and LL.D. in 1887. During his university career he won the University, Lithgow, Barker, and Renwick scholarships, and the John Smith prize.

Legal career
Cullen was called to the bar in 1883 and his progress at first was slow. But, he eventually took high rank at the equity bar, and argued with much success before the Supreme Court of New South Wales and the High Court of Australia (an institution whose creation he had vigorously supported). He became a KC in 1905. He regularly appeared in the High Court, and was considered one of the leading barristers appearing in the High Court, including appearing in R v Governor of South Australia; Ex parte Vardon, Union Label case, and the Steel Rails case.

Political career
Cullen entered politics in 1891 when he was elected a member of the New South Wales Legislative Assembly for Camden. He was defeated at the 1894 election, and in 1895 was appointed to the New South Wales Legislative Council. Though not a strong party man, or even a politician by temperament, he was a useful member of the house who never spoke unless he could contribute something constructive to the debate. Cullen was a Federationist.

University of Sydney
His chief interest from his undergraduate days was the University of Sydney; he was elected a member of the university senate in 1896, vice-chancellor in 1908, and chancellor in 1914. During his early days in the Legislative Council he introduced a bill embodying important reforms in the conduct of the university, although some of these were not brought into effect until many years after. He was elected term after term as chancellor, and when he resigned on account of his health and his advanced age in December 1934, he had been in office for a longer period than any previous chancellor, during a time of great expansion.

Judicial career
In January 1910 he was appointed Chief Justice of New South Wales in succession to Sir Frederick Darley, and in March was appointed Lieutenant-Governor. Cullen found much business awaiting him at the Supreme Court, but his great capacity for work soon cleared up the arrears. He was a very sound equity and constitutional lawyer who as chief justice worthily upheld the traditions of his court. Cullen was courteous and considerate to juniors appearing before him, and could hold his own with the most experienced barristers. He had great conscientiousness, excellent knowledge of the law and sound judgment, and consequently his judgments were seldom upset.

Late life
Cullen retired as Chief Justice in January 1925 but retained the position of Lieutenant-Governor until September 1930. He administered the State of NSW on several occasions during the absence of governors from the State or between appointments. He died at Leura on 6 April 1935.  He married in 1891 Lily, eldest daughter of the Hon. R. H. D. White, who died in 1931. He was survived by two sons and a daughter. He was knighted in 1911 and created KCMG in 1912.

Cullen was interested in literature, in the Australian flora (Eucalyptus cullenii was named for him), and in social and philanthropic movements.

References

 

1855 births
1935 deaths
Members of the New South Wales Legislative Assembly
Members of the New South Wales Legislative Council
Chief Justices of New South Wales
Lieutenant-Governors of New South Wales
Judges of the Supreme Court of New South Wales
Australian Knights Commander of the Order of St Michael and St George
Australian federationists
Vice-Chancellors of the University of Sydney
Chancellors of the University of Sydney